State Route 445 (SR 445) is a 12.6 mile long east-west state highway in West Tennessee. It connects the towns of Rutherford and Greenfield and provides access to Big Cypress Tree State Park.

Route description

SR 445 begins in Gibson County at an intersection with SR 105, just across the Rutherford Fork of the Obion River from the town of Rutherford. It goes north along Walnut Grove Road through rural areas before turning east along Toole-Pate Levee Road. The highway then crosses a bridge over the South Fork of the Obion River shortly before crossing into Weakley County. The highway now becomes Kimery Store Road and has an intersection with Big Cypress Road, the access road to Big Cypress Tree State Park.  SR 445 then enters Greenfield, where it comes to an end at an intersection with US 45E/SR 43 at the northern edge of town. The entire route of SR 445 is a two-lane highway.

Major intersections

References

445
Transportation in Gibson County, Tennessee
Transportation in Weakley County, Tennessee